Events from the year 1129 in Ireland.

Incumbents
High King: Toirdelbach Ua Conchobair

Deaths

Saint Ceallach (Celsus), (b 1080), abbot of Armagh.  He presided at the synod of Rathbreasail in 1111.

References

Years of the 12th century in Ireland